Masood Helali is a Bangladesh Nationalist Party politician. He was elected a member of parliament from Kishoreganj-3 in February 1996.

Career 
Masood Helali is a former general secretary and advisor of Kishoreganj district BNP. He was elected to parliament from Kishoreganj-3 as a Bangladesh Nationalist Party candidate in 15 February 1996 Bangladeshi general election.

He was defeated from Kishoreganj-3 constituency on 12 June 1996 and 2001 on the nomination of Bangladesh Nationalist Party.

References 

Living people
Year of birth missing (living people)
People from Kishoreganj District
Bangladesh Nationalist Party politicians
6th Jatiya Sangsad members
20th-century Bengalis
21st-century Bengalis